The Guatemalan deer mouse (Peromyscus guatemalensis) is a species of rodent in the family Cricetidae. It is found in Guatemala and Mexico.

References

Musser, G. G. and M. D. Carleton. (2005). Superfamily Muroidea. pp. 894–1531 in Mammal Species of the World a Taxonomic and Geographic Reference. D. E. Wilson and D. M. Reeder eds. Johns Hopkins University Press, Baltimore.

Guatemalan deer mouse
Rodents of Central America
Mammals of Mexico
Least concern biota of North America
Mammals described in 1898
Taxonomy articles created by Polbot
Taxa named by Clinton Hart Merriam